Unione Sportiva Dilettantistica Lavello is an Italian association football club located in Lavello, Basilicata. It currently plays in Serie D. Its colors are green and yellow. 

Association football clubs established in 1993
Football clubs in Basilicata
Lavello